Suh Sui Cho was a male table tennis player from Hong Kong. From 1952 to 1957 he won one medal in singles, three medals in doubles, and three medals in team events in the Asian Table Tennis Championships and in the World Table Tennis Championships.#

The world championship medal came during the 1952 World Table Tennis Championships where he won a bronze medal in the Swaythling Cup (men's team event) when representing Hong Kong.

See also
 List of table tennis players
 List of World Table Tennis Championships medalists

References

Hong Kong male table tennis players
1922 births
2008 deaths
Table tennis players from Shanghai
Chinese emigrants to British Hong Kong
Hong Kong emigrants to Canada